The Kakazai (Urdu), also known as Loi, Loe, or Loye Mamund, a division of the Mamund clan, are a Pashtun tribe part of the larger Tarkani (ترکاڼي) tribe who are primarily settled in Bajaur Agency, Pakistan, but originally hailed from the Laghman province of Afghanistan. However, it has grown and scattered around to such an extent that it is recognized as tribe of its own.

Etymology
The name "Kakazai" means "descendants/offspring/children of Kaka (کاکا / ککا)"  (in Pashto, Kaka literally means Uncle and used to address an elderly person as well as Paternal Uncle whereas Kakae = a contemporary but obsolete Afghan name for a male. Zai = children of, a root also used in other Pashtun tribes such as Yousafzai). Given that Mamund, the father of Kakazai, had two sons: Kakazai and Wur or Wara, meaning small, little or minor, also known as Wur Mamund or Wara Mamund, meaning small, little or minor Mamund or descendants/offspring/children of small, little, minor Mamund, thus, in this particular case Kakazai means descendants/offspring/children of the elder person/brother hence also known as Loi Mamund, meaning great, large, huge, big Mamund or descendants/offspring/children of great, large, huge, big Mamund. Spelling variants include: Kakizi, Kakaezai, Kakezai, Kakaizai, Kakay Zai, Kakayzai, Kakeyzai, Kaka Zai and Kakkayzai.

History

Early history
The Kakazai, along with other Pashtun tribes, came to South Asia during invasions such as those of Mahmud of Ghazni and Bahlul Lodi, settling in various regions.

Noting the martial legacy of the Kakazai Pashtuns, Pir Moazzam Shah in his book ‘Tawareekh-e-Hafiz Rahmat Khani’ (Page 89-91 - Originally Published in 1624 AD) and Olaf Caroe in his book ‘The Pathans 550 BC-AD 1957’ (Page 184-185 - First published in 1958), wrote about a battle between the Yousafzais and the Dilazaks in which Malik Haibu (Dilazak) was given the first sword blow by Payenda Kakazai Tarklanri but eventually got beheaded by Burhan Kakazai Tarklanri sword blow while fighting on the side of the Yousafzais in order to aid them to conquer Bajour from the Dilazaks.

For the invading armies, much of Punjab and other areas became a repository with rest houses, cantonments and border posts established to keep an eye on things in the region as well as to keep abreast of any new information (such as the possible weakening of another empire etc.), and many officers along with their families would settle there. As is still very true in large areas of Khyber Pakhtunkhwa and Afghanistan's Pashtun belt, the land is often quite barren and hostile only capable of hosting a limited population.  Once the population or a tribe's numbers exceeded a certain threshold, they would often travel East to more settled areas (Sindh, Punjab, Kashmir etc.) or would be pushed out by other tribes in the search of productive agricultural land. The area of Sialkot principally, as well as Faisalabad, Wazirabad and parts of Lahore, had much productive agricultural lands and were ruled by a series of Pashtun families many of whom were Kakazai but also Burki and Niazi Pashtuns.

British-Raj era
Many Kakazai, Burki and other notable Pashtun families had previously settled in Jalandhar and Gurdaspur districts of Pre-independent British India where they had set up colonies. A major Kakazai group from Gurdaspur, East Punjab, India settled in twelve villages, including Babal Chak, Faizullah Chak, Sut Kohiah (Satkoha), and Wazir Chak, near Dhariwal. At the independence in August 1947, having been initially told they (being Muslim) would be in Pakistan, they were caught up in the ensuing violence and the survivors displaced when their area became part of India.

Modern era
Today, the majority of the Kakazai reside in Pakistan and Afghanistan.

In Afghanistan, they reside in Marawara District, and the Barkanai and Shortan areas of Kunar as well as some areas of Laghman.

In Pakistan, they reside in all provinces, particularly in the areas of Dara Kakazai (Valley of Watelai, also known as Mamund Valley), Bajaur Agency (Lagharai, Kalozai, Kaga, Mukha, Maina and Ghakhi areas of Mamund Tehsil), Peshawar, Lahore, Abbottabad, Sialkot (The Kakazai are still among the dominant tribes in Sialkot despite city's cosmopolitan flavor, and are still the original owners of vast swathes of prime land in this district.), Dera Ghazi Khan, Quetta, Karachi, Kashmir, Jehlum, Bhalwal, Sargodha, Chakwal, Gujrat, Chak Karal, Isa Khel, Musa Khel, and Killi Kakazai (Pishin, Baluchistan).

Consequently, the Kakazai Pashtuns not residing in Pashto-speaking areas, despite practicing Pashtunwali and maintaining dress, cuisine and martial legacy as per their Pashtun traditions, do not exclusively speak Pashto but may speak other languages indigenous to Pakistan such as Urdu, Punjabi, Siraiki, Hindko and Balochi.

Sub-divisions
Daulat Khel
Khulozai
Mahsud Khel
Maghdud Khel
Mahmud Khel
Umar Khel
Yusaf Khel

See also
List of Kakazai people

References

Sarbani Pashtun tribes
Bajaur Agency
People from Bajaur District
Ethnic groups in Laghman Province
Ethnic groups in Kunar Province